George G. Scovil (1842–1908) was a merchant and political figure in New Brunswick, Canada. He represented King's County in the Legislative Assembly of New Brunswick from 1892 to 1908 as a Liberal member.

He was born in Springfield, Kings County, New Brunswick, and educated at Kingston. Scovil married Leah Spragg. He owned a general store and was also involved in farming and lumbering. He served on the municipal council.

References 
The Canadian parliamentary companion, 1897 JA Gemmill

1842 births
1908 deaths
New Brunswick Liberal Association MLAs